The 1991–92 Botola is the 36th season of the Moroccan Premier League. Kawkab Marrakech are the holders of the title.

References

Morocco 1991–92

Botola seasons
Morocco
Botola